Long intergenic non-protein coding RNA 607 is a protein that in humans is encoded by the LINC00607 gene.

References

Further reading